The IBA World Boxing Championships, and the IBA Women's World Boxing Championships (previously known as AIBA), are biennial amateur boxing competitions organised by the International Boxing Association (IBA), which is the sport governing body. Alongside the Olympic boxing programme, they are the highest level of competition for the sport. The championships were first held for men in 1974 and the first women's championships were held over 25 years later in 2001. 

Both championships are held separately on biennial schedules. Since 1989 the men's championships are held every odd year; the women's championships were held in even years between 2006 and 2018 and switched to a nominal odd-year schedule in 2019.

Men's editions
As of 1 August 2021, men are grouped into 13 weight classes as follows:

 46–48 kg (Minimumweight)
 48–51 kg (Flyweight)
 51–54 kg (Bantamweight)
 54–57 kg (Featherweight)
 57–60 kg (Lightweight)
 60–63.5 kg (Light welterweight)
 63.5–67 kg (Welterweight)
 67–71 kg (Light middleweight)
 71–75 kg (Middleweight)
 75–80 kg (Light heavyweight)
 80–86 kg (Cruiserweight)
 86–92 kg (Heavyweight)
 +92 kg (Super heavyweight)

All-time medal table (1974–2021)
Updated after the 2021 AIBA World Boxing Championships.

Notes

Multiple gold medalists
Boldface denotes active amateur boxers and highest medal count among all boxers (including these who not included in these tables) per type.

Women's editions
As of 1 August 2021, women are grouped into 12 weight classes as follows:

 45–48 kg (Minimumweight)
 48–50 kg (Light flyweight)
 50–52 kg (Flyweight)
 52–54 kg (Bantamweight)
 54–57 kg (Featherweight)
 57–60 kg (Lightweight)
 60–63 kg (Light welterweight)
 63–66 kg (Welterweight)
 66–70 kg (Light middleweight)
 70–75 kg (Middleweight)
 75–81 kg (Light heavyweight)
 +81 kg (Heavyweight)

All-time medal table (2001–2022)
Updated after the 2022 IBA Women's World Boxing Championships.

Notes

Multiple gold medalists
Boldface denotes active boxers and highest medal count among all boxers (including these who are not included in these tables) per type. In 2018, Mary Kom defeated Ukrainian boxer Hanna Okhota with a 5–0 win in the 48 kg weight category, she is now tied with Cuban legend Felix Savon’s haul of six golds.

See also
 AIBA World Championships Challenge
 List of medalists at the AIBA World Boxing Championships
 List of medalists at the AIBA Women's World Boxing Championships

References

 
Amateur boxing
World championships in boxing
Recurring sporting events established in 1974